Stephan Protschka (born 8 November 1977) is a German politician. Born in Dingolfing, Bavaria, he represents Alternative for Germany (AfD). Stephan Protschka has served as a member of the Bundestag from the state of Bavaria since 2017.

Life 
He became member of the bundestag after the 2017 German federal election. He is a member of the Committee for Food and Agriculture.
In 2019 he was involved in controversy after funding and supporting a memorial in Poland honoring German soldiers in WWII and the Nazi paramilitary organization Volksdeutscher Selbstschutz. The construction of the memorial was partially initiated by the neonazi organization Junge Nationalisten which is being monitored by the German intelligence services. Polish courts started an investigation against Protschka for supporting Nazism and defamation of victims of the holocaust.

References

External links 

  
 Bundestag biography 

1977 births
Living people
Members of the Bundestag for Bavaria
Members of the Bundestag 2017–2021
Members of the Bundestag 2021–2025
Members of the Bundestag for the Alternative for Germany
People from Dingolfing-Landau